Pedro Manuel Regateiro Venâncio (born 21 November 1963) is a Portuguese former footballer who played as a central defender.

Club career
During his career, Setúbal-born Venâncio represented two clubs in the Primeira Liga, Sporting CP and Boavista FC, amassing more than 250 official appearances for the former albeit without no silverware won during his ten-year spell. He retired at only 30, in a career downed by constant injuries.

During his stint at Sporting, Venâncio formed a pair of youth graduate stoppers alongside António Morato.

International career
Venâncio won 21 caps for Portugal, over six years. He was selected for the 1986 FIFA World Cup, but had to quit before the tournament in Mexico started due to an injury.

Personal life
Venâncio's son, Frederico, was also a footballer and a central defender. He too was brought up at Vitória.

Honours
Boavista
Supertaça Cândido de Oliveira: 1992

References

External links

1963 births
Living people
Sportspeople from Setúbal
Portuguese footballers
Association football defenders
Primeira Liga players
Sporting CP footballers
Boavista F.C. players
Portugal youth international footballers
Portugal under-21 international footballers
Portugal international footballers